Monaco Grand Prix: Racing Simulation 2, also known as just Monaco Grand Prix, is a Formula one racing game developed and published by Ubisoft for Microsoft Windows, Nintendo 64, PlayStation, and Dreamcast. It was released in 1998-1999. A sequel, Racing Simulation 3, was released in 2002.

Gameplay
The game is based on the Formula One World Championship, but does not have the licence to use drivers names, official cars, etc; the developers instead acquired the Automobile Club de Monaco licence, and a licence to use Formula One's official sponsors; Schweppes and Castrol among others, helping add to the authenticity of the game. The game is unrelated to Sega's Monaco GP series.

The sequel to F1 Racing Simulation, it features 17 authentic tracks, 11 teams and cars with their 22 drivers. The Monaco license is used, although the teams themselves are not licensed. A total of 22 camera views are provided. Telemetry is stored and analysed in a similar way to Grand Prix 2, and physics are modelled to be realistic. 

There are eight different modes to race, the new ones being a career mode in which the player starts with a poor team and must drive well enough to earn competitive rides, and scenarios recreating key races for particular drivers. Returning from the first game are Time Attack, a full championship, and a 1950s retro mode. There is also a track editor for the players to create their own tracks.

Reception

The game received "favorable" reviews on all platforms except the Dreamcast version, which received "average" reviews, according to the review aggregation website GameRankings. PC Gamer gave the PC version universal acclaim, while PC Accelerator gave it a favorable review, months before its U.S. release. An unnamed reviewer of Next Generation gave the N64 version a positive review, praising gameplay, number of tracks and cars, graphics, physics and two player screen-mode. Four issues later, however, Chris Carla of the same magazine (now labeled NextGen) said of the Dreamcast version of the game as solid, but thought that Ubisoft's title Speed Devils was better. In Japan, where the same Dreamcast version was ported for release on March 11, 1999, followed by the PlayStation version on September 30, Famitsu gave it a score of 31 out of 40 for the former, and 26 out of 40 for the latter.

Pete Wilton of Official UK PlayStation Magazine gave the PlayStation version seven out of ten; although criticising minor game's issues, he called Monaco GP better than F1 '98, but inferior to the latter's previous title. Computer Games Strategy Plus gave the PC version four-and-a-half stars out of five, praising graphics, accurate driving model, and multiplayer. Edge gave the same PC version a score of seven out of ten in its December 1998 issue, despite noting some technical issues. Seven issues later, the same magazine gave the Japanese Dreamcast import six out of ten, criticing it as the same version without some enhancements, but was generally positive.

AllGame gave the Dreamcast, PC and PlayStation versions each three stars out of five, with Brad Cook saying of the Dreamcast version: "I have to give this game a higher rating than I thought I would simply because I know it will appeal to its intended audience. Just stay away if you want arcade-style action"; Michael L. House saying that the PC version "crosses the finish line in fairly good shape. I'm a firm believer that all games don't necessarily have to fit exclusively in a restrictive "either/or" category but can fill niches in a sliding scale of desirability. Just as those gamers who do themselves an injustice by adamantly shouting there is only one viable golf simulation because of a strict, narrow mindset, so to[o] will racing fans unwilling to experience alternatives in the Formula 1 racing genre"; while Jonathan Sutyak was positive of PlayStation version.

In an early review Boba Fatt of GamePro called the European PlayStation version "the slowpoke of the PlayStation superhighway." Vicious Sid said of the European Nintendo 64 version in an early review, "Sim fans dying for a break from the daunting F1 World Grand Prix will likely flock to Monaco Grand Prix, but the more accessible Rush 2: Extreme Racing USA remains the best choice for armchair drivers." Air Hendrix said in another review that the same console version "delivers an impressive collection of sixteen tracks from around the world and eleven different racing teams, each including multiple drivers. Unfortunately this only truly appeals to a serious race fan -- if you don't know a Zaccitan from a Humigger, this probably won't get you very excited." Mark Asher called the PC version "a superior racing experience that really captures the feel of being in a Formula 1 car." Air Hendrix said of the Dreamcast version in one review, "As the white flag drops, Monaco Grand Prix has a lot more under its hood than Flag to Flag – but that also means ih as a lot more sim-style realism to contend with. If that suits your fancy, you'll never look back, but lots of gamers will prefer Flags lighter side and stronger two-player game." iBot said of the same console version in another review, "With the many different race games geared for several different audiences coming out at the Dreamcast launch, Monaco is geared towards the serious racing enthusiasts, while more fun can quickly be had with Sega Sports' Flag to Flag."

Jes Bickham of N64 Magazine gave the N64 version 87%, while Cam Shea of Hyper gave it 83%. Electronic Gaming Monthly and Nintendo Power gave the European version average reviews, months before its U.S. release date. In addition, Jackson Goethe-Snape of Hyper gave it 79% for the PC version, while Eliot Fish gave it 80% for the Dreamcast version.

The PC version was a runner-up for Computer Games Strategy Plus 1999 "Racing Game of the Year" award, which ultimately went to Dirt Track Racing. Its staff wrote that the game's graphics and excellent vehicle physics were the hallmark in the series.

Trivia
 Ubisoft did not have the official FIA license. Therefore they licensed only the Monaco track and named the game after it. All other F1 tracks are also included, but using different names.
 In the United Kingdom, the title is Racing Simulation: Monaco Grand Prix.
 In Germany, the game is just known as Racing Simulation 2 and has a different cover.

Notes

References

External links
Console Passion - Sega Dreamcast Games

1998 video games
Dreamcast games
Formula One video games
Nintendo 64 games
PlayStation (console) games
Ubisoft games
Video game sequels
Video games developed in France
Windows games